Gilson Luís Pinheiro Júnior (born 21 April 1985), known as Juninho, is a Brazilian footballer who plays as midfielder for FC Serrières in the Swiss 2. Liga Interregional.

He replaced Juninho Santana and took his no.10 shirt at Swiss club FC Winterthur in January 2008.

He is the brother of Paquito.

External links
 Brazilian FA Database
 Juninho Pinheiro
http://www.football.ch/sfl/876315/de/Kader.aspx?tId=0&pId=604887

1985 births
Living people
Brazilian footballers
Brazilian expatriate footballers
Brazilian expatriate sportspeople in Italy
Brazilian expatriate sportspeople in Switzerland
Expatriate footballers in Italy
Expatriate footballers in Switzerland
Association football midfielders
Footballers from Curitiba
A.C. Perugia Calcio players
FC Chiasso players
Sport Club Corinthians Paulista players
FC Serrières players
FC Kreuzlingen players